Brooklin is an unincorporated community in Summers County, West Virginia, United States, located across the New River from Hinton.

References

Unincorporated communities in Summers County, West Virginia
Unincorporated communities in West Virginia